The cemita is a torta originally from Puebla, Mexico. Also known as cemita poblana, it derives from the city (and region) of Puebla. The word refers to the sandwich as well as to the roll it is typically served on, a bread roll covered with sesame seeds.
 Additionally, the ingredients usually are restricted to sliced avocado, meat, white cheese, onions, the herb pápalo and chipotle adobado, or jalapeño.

Name
The Real Academia Española says cemita comes from "acemite" (archaic Spanish for "bran") which in turn comes from Aramaic, and is related to Greek σεμίδαλις (semídalis) ("semolina").

Reception
The Daily Meal reviewed the cemita, saying "there are numerous variations, but it's always a delicious mouthful" in their article "12 Life-Changing Sandwiches You've Never Heard Of".

See also

 Mexican breads
 Mexican cuisine
 List of bread rolls
 List of Mexican dishes
 List of sandwiches

References

External links

Mexican breads
Egg sandwiches
Sweet breads